Ayat Vagozari (born 26 July 1961, in Juybar) is a retired freestyle wrestler from Iran. He won a silver medal at the 1990 Asian Games. He also participated at the 1988 Summer Olympics.

His brother Aziz Vagozari is also an Asian Champion in freestyle wrestling.

References

External links
 

1961 births
Living people
Iranian male sport wrestlers
Wrestlers at the 1988 Summer Olympics
Olympic wrestlers of Iran
Asian Games silver medalists for Iran
Asian Games medalists in wrestling
Wrestlers at the 1990 Asian Games
Medalists at the 1990 Asian Games
People from Juybar
Sportspeople from Mazandaran province
20th-century Iranian people
21st-century Iranian people